Dušan Kalaba (born 25 May 1996) is a Serbian cyclist, who currently rides for UCI Continental team Northwave Siatek Olmo.

Major results

2013
 National Junior Road Championships
2nd Road race
3rd Time trial
2014
 3rd Time trial, National Junior Road Championships
 4th Overall Belgrade Trophy Milan Panić
2016
 2nd Time trial, National Road Championships
 10th Umag Trophy
2017
 1st  Road race, National Road Championships
 2nd Overall Tour of Xingtai
1st  Points classification
1st  Young rider classification
 5th Törökbálint GP
2018
 3rd Road race, National Road Championships
2019
 5th Road race, National Road Championships

References

External links

1996 births
Living people
Serbian male cyclists
Competitors at the 2018 Mediterranean Games
Mediterranean Games competitors for Serbia
21st-century Serbian people